A refueling Fast Fill System allows speedy and safe refueling for many types of equipment. This includes mining, heavy construction, busses and railroad. These refueling Fast Fill Systems utilize an automatic shut off fuel nozzle, receiver and level control device.

Refueling Fast Fill Systems in general allow for ground level refueling and automatic shut-off upon a full tank. Ground level refueling increases operator safety as climbing onto vehicles during refueling is not necessary as the fill point receiver may be located in a location on the vehicle which is easily accessed.

Pressurized Refueling Fast Fill Systems
Pressurized refueling Fast Fill Systems were first developed in the 1950s and installed on almost all large vehicles. Since that time many improvements and upgrades have been made. Caterpillar introduced a pressureless refueling Fast Fill System in 1998 for the Caterpillar D11 track type tractor replacing the original pressurized system. This too was safer for the operator, and had a high rate of success in avoiding ground contamination. Since 1998 there have been many other manufacturers that have developed various types of pressureless refueling Fast Fill Systems.

Pressurized refueling Fast Fill Systems operate via sealing the fuel tank at the appropriate fill point thus creating internal pressure.  The automatic shut off nozzle shuts off when pressure in the fuel system reaches 9 psi (62 kPa) or greater.  Due to the pressure introduced into the fuel tank, most tanks require additional structure to prevent bursting or damaged weld joints. This bursting is both a safety and environmental hazard.

Pressureless Refueling Fast Fill Systems
Pressureless refueling Fast Fill Systems bring unique advantages to fast delivery of fuel and other fluids. These systems operate via a closed loop system where all pressure is contained within interior signal lines, level controllers, and a shut-off valves. When the fuel reaches the predetermined fill point inside the tank, a valve then closes and pressure begins to build within the interior signal line. Once the pressure within that signal line reaches the predetermined shut off pressure of the fueling nozzle the fueling nozzle immediately shuts off.  Due to differential pressure and an internal spring, the shutoff valve is forced closed and fuel cannot be forced into the tank preventing it from overfilling and spilling. Non-pressurized refueling systems do not require tank pressurization for automatic nozzle shut-off, thus allowing their use on thin-walled metallic and composite material fuel tanks that are often used in today's industry.

Pressureless Refueling Fast Fill Systems reduce fuel spills and provided more accurate filling when used with automatic refueling nozzles. They reduce operator slip, trip and falls; and the risk of injury due to product overfill splash. The system is also designed to prevent overfilling or manual override of the fueling system.   A number of pressureless refueling Fast Fill Systems are available from  an OEM or authorized OEM Distributor. Most equipment, currently not set up with pressureless refueling Fast Fill Systems, can be retrofitted with applications from OEMs such as Fast Fill Systems , International, Shaw Development, Banlaw , Hydrau-Flo®,  and others

Pressureless refueling Fast Fill Systems meet European directive 97/23/EC  which permits their use in the European Union as any tank pressurization during refuel is less than 7.3 psi (0.5 bar).

Installation procedures for pressureless refueling Fast Fill Systems  are documented in Fast Fill Systems Fueling Installation for Off-Road Self-Propelled Work Machines SAE J176.  Proper installation is important to maintain operator safety and proper functionality of the system. It is recommended to contact the manufacturer of the pressureless refueling Fast Fill System for updated and accurate installation instructions.

Diesel Fast Fill Safety is paramount and discussed in more detail in The Diesel Safety Bulletin

Gallery

References

Automotive technologies